Mount Rose Summit is a mountain pass located in the Carson Range near Mount Rose and Slide Mountain, northeast of Incline Village, Nevada, United States. The  pass is traversed by State Route 431, which is the highest point of the highway and the highest mountain pass in the Sierra Nevada that remains open year-round. The saddle itself features a parking lot and a small building which both serve as a highway stop. A closed dirt road leading to the Mount Rose Ski Resort ends near the northern section of the summit. The pass is the low point of the saddle between Slide Mountain and Tamarack Peak.

References

Mountain passes of Nevada
Landforms of Washoe County, Nevada